Corpus Christi Catholic High School may refer to:

Corpus Christi Catholic High School, Fulwood, Lancashire, England
Corpus Christi Catholic High School, Wollongong, New South Wales, Australia
Corpus Christi Roman Catholic High School, Cardiff, Wales

See also
Two Catholic high schools in Corpus Christi, Texas:
Incarnate Word Academy
St. John Paul II High School